Seventeen is a 1940 American comedy film based upon the novel of the same name by Booth Tarkington and the subsequent play written by Stannard Mears, Hugh Stanislaus Stange and Stuart Walker. Directed by Louis King, the film stars Jackie Cooper, Betty Field, Otto Kruger, Ann Shoemaker, Norma Gene Nelson and Betty Moran. It was released on March 1, 1940, by Paramount Pictures.

Plot

Cast 
Jackie Cooper as William Sylvanus Baxter
Betty Field as Lola Pratt
Otto Kruger as Sylvanus Baxter
Ann Shoemaker as Mary Baxter
Norma Gene Nelson as Jane Baxter 
Betty Moran as May Parcher
Thomas W. Ross as Edward P. Parcher 
Peter Lind Hayes as George Cooper 
Buddy Pepper as Johnnie Watson
Donald Haines as Joe Bullitt
Richard Denning as Jack
Paul E. Burns as McGrill
Hal Clements as Wally Banks
Edward Earle as Headwaiter
Stanley Price as Waiter
Joey Ray as Orchestra Leader
Fred 'Snowflake' Toones as Genesis 
Hattie Noel as Adella

References

External links 
 

1940 films
Paramount Pictures films
American comedy films
1940 comedy films
Films directed by Louis King
Films based on works by Booth Tarkington
American black-and-white films
1940s English-language films
1940s American films